Alois Jaros (15 January 1930 – 24 August 2007) was an Austrian footballer. He played in one match for the Austria national football team in 1957.

References

External links
 

1930 births
2007 deaths
Austrian footballers
Austria international footballers
Place of birth missing
Association footballers not categorized by position